All the Way from Tuam is the second studio album by Irish rock band The Saw Doctors. The CD was released on The Saw Doctors' own record label, Shamtown Records and has the catalogue number of SAWDOC002CD. It is named after the band's home town, Tuam.

Track listing
All songs written by Leo Moran and Davy Carton except where indicated.

"The Green and Red of Mayo" (Jarir Al-Majar, Moran, Carton)
"You Got Me On the Run"
"Pied Piper"
"Me Heart Is Livin' in the Sixties Still" (Moran, Pearse Doherty, Carton, John Donnelly)
"Hay Wrap" (Moran, Carton, Doherty, Donnelly, John Burke)
"Wake Up Sleeping"
"Midnight Express" (Carton)
"Broke My Heart"
"Exhilarating Sadness"
"All the Way from Tuam"
"F.C.A."
"Music I Love" (Moran, Carton, Doherty, Donnelly)
"Yvonne" (Moran, Doherty, Carton, Donnelly)
"Never Mind the Strangers"

Personnel

Band
Davy Carton: Vocals, Guitar
Leo Moran: Guitar, Backing Vocals
John Donnelly: Drums, Percussion, Vocals
Pearse Doherty: Bass guitar, Vocals
Tony Lambert: Keyboards, Guitar, Accordion, Banjo, Vocals
John Burke: Mandolin, Guitar, Vocals

Guest musicians
James Barton: Violin
Sharon McKinley: Cello
Robin Stowell: Violin
Anthony Thistlethwaite: Saxophone
Glenn Thompson: Percussion
Philip Tomkins: Viola
Greg Haver: Percussion
Geoff York: Viola

External links
The Saw Doctors Official Website

The Saw Doctors albums
1992 albums